Hana Mučková (born 4 September 1998) is a Czech female handball player who plays for DHC Sokol Poruba and the Czech Republic national team.

Achievements
Czech First Division:
Bronze Medalist: 2016

References

1998 births
Living people
Sportspeople from Ostrava
Czech female handball players